Philip James Rutledge (October 15, 1925 – January 26, 2007) was a senior administrator during the presidency of  Lyndon B. Johnson, and past President of the American Society for Public Administration, Rutledge was a professor of public and environmental affairs and political science at Indiana University Northwest, and he also was chair of the Department of Public Administration at Howard University.

Biography 
Rutledge was born October 15, 1925 in Dawson, Georgia.

He received s bachelor's degree in political science and sociology from Roosevelt University in Chicago, and a master's of Public Health from the  University of Michigan School of Public Health. In 1980, he received an Honorary Doctor of Laws from Indiana University Bloomington.

He died on January 26, 2007.

Further reading

References 

Public administration
1925 births
2007 deaths
Public administration scholars
American diplomats
American male writers
Harvard Fellows
University of Michigan School of Public Health alumni
Roosevelt University alumni
Howard University faculty